Marie Gutheil-Schoder (16 February 1874 – 4 October 1935) was an important German soprano.

Born Marie Schoder in Weimar, she married Gustav Gutheil in 1899, with whom she lived until his death in 1914.  In 1920, she married the photographer Franz Xaver Setzer.

She debuted in the secondary role of the First Lady at the Weimar Court Opera in The Magic Flute in her native city of Weimar in 1891. Gustav Mahler engaged her for the Vienna State Opera in 1900, where she remained until 1926. She appeared at the Royal Opera House as Octavian in Der Rosenkavalier in 1913. One of her famous roles was her portrayal of a "strange, Nietzschean" Carmen. She was seen in the 1914 Vienna premiere of Richard Strauss's ballet, Josephslegende as Potiphar's Wife. She created Esmeralda in the world premiere of Franz Schmidt's opera Notre Dame in the same year.

Gutheil-Schoder created the fiercely difficult single role of Arnold Schoenberg's monodrama Erwartung in 1924 in Prague; earlier that year, she performed his Pierrot lunaire. Mahler termed her "a musical genius," and she was highly regarded as a musician and singing-actress, although she seemed to be, as one Viennese critic wrote, "the singer without a voice." In her later career, she became a stage director of opera.

She was a well-known pedagogue as well, one of her students being the mezzo-soprano Risë Stevens. She died at the age of 61, in Ilmenau, Germany.

Recordings

In 1902, she recorded for Gramophone & Typewriter Company Records, in Vienna: Two excerpts from Carmen, an aria from The Merry Wives of Windsor, and duets from La dame blanche and Les contes d'Hoffmann were performed.  She is heard in Volume I of EMI's The Record of Singing, in the duet from La dame blanche.

In 2004, Symposium Records issued a Compact Disc entitled Vienna – The Mahler Years. Included are the two duets Gutheil-Schoder recorded (with Franz Naval), along with recordings by Selma Kurz, Leo Slezak, Erik Schmedes, Lilli Lehmann, etc.

References
 The Concise Oxford Dictionary of Opera, by John Warrack and Ewan West, Oxford University Press, 1996.

External links 
  Marie Gutheil-Schoder in an excerpt from Die lustigen Weiber von Windsor (1902).

1874 births
1935 deaths
German operatic sopranos
German opera directors
Female opera directors
Voice teachers
People from Saxe-Weimar-Eisenach
Musicians from Weimar
19th-century German women opera singers
20th-century German women opera singers
Women music educators